The Adventures of Robin Hoodnik is an animated television movie produced by Hanna-Barbera Productions. Broadcasting on the ABC television network on November 4, 1972, it was part of The ABC Saturday Superstar Movie series. The special featured an all-animal cast in a retelling of Robin Hood. The show premiered just a year before Walt Disney Productions released their theatrical animated version of the story. Nineteen years later, in 1991, Hanna-Barbera produced another television adaptation of the Robin Hood legend, Young Robin Hood, their international co-production with CINAR, Crayon Animation and France Animation.

Cast
 Cynthia Adler as Maid Marian
 Daws Butler as Scounger and Richard
 Joe E. Ross as Oxx
 Hal Smith as Donkey
 John Stephenson as Sheriff of Nottingham and Carbuncle
 Len Weinrib as Robin Hoodnik, Alan Airedale, Whirlin' Merlin, Lord Scurvy, Friar Pork, and Little John

See also
 List of works produced by Hanna-Barbera
 Robin Hood (disambiguation)

References

External links
 
 

1972 television films
1972 films
Hanna-Barbera animated films
Hanna-Barbera television specials
The ABC Saturday Superstar Movie
Films directed by William Hanna
Films directed by Joseph Barbera
1970s American animated films
Robin Hood films
Robin Hood parodies
1970s English-language films